Klub malog fudbala Ekonomac, commonly known as Ekonomac Kragujevac, is a Serbian futsal club based in Kragujevac. Ekonomac is currently competing in the Prva Futsal Liga, which is the premier futsal league in Serbia.

History

Early years (2000–2006)
Futsal Club Ekonomac was founded on 7 November 2000 by a group of students from the Faculty of Economics of the university of University of Kragujevac; with professor Veroljub Dugalić at its front along with a group of his university colleagues. The club started competing in the lowest futsal league of Serbia at that time, with the goal of popularization of this sport at the university and in Kragujevac. During the next year the club made a big success and, with the reinforcement of new players, qualified to play in what was at that time known as the Republic League of Serbia. Since the 2004–05 season Ekonomac is competing in the highest league ranking.

Golden years (2006–2015)
In the 2006–07 season Ekonomac finished as runners-up in the national league. In 2008, Ekonomac won the Balkan Cup and two months later, they won their first Serbian championship. In the following seasons (2009–10, 2010–11, and 2011–12), Ekonomac defended the Serbian championship title. In the 2012–13 season Ekonomac won its first national futsal cup of Serbia. By winning the national championship in the same season, 2012–13, Ekonomac became the most successful futsal club of all time in Serbia. As the most successful futsal club in the history of this sport in the country, Ekonomac continued with what might be the club's best season so far, by winning the championship in the 2013–14 season with an undefeated record (only one draw). In the 2014–15 season, Ekonomac won the Serbian championship again as well as reaching the elite round of the UEFA Futsal Cup.

UEFA Futsal Cup

The club made its first appearance in the UEFA Futsal Cup in 2008 when they reached the elite round. They qualified as the Serbian champions and started the competition in the main round. Ekonomac set a large list of records in its eight appearances in the UEFA Futsal Cup, being the only Serbian futsal club who participated eight times. The club also reached the elite round every time it participated in UEFA competitions.

UEFA Ranking
By frequently participating in the UEFA Futsal Cup, Ekonomac was ranked high in the UEFA club ranking list. In 2015, when UEFA published the new futsal club ranking list, KMF Ekonomac was ranked as the fourth futsal club in Europe with 21,000 points. With this new ranking, Ekonomac qualified directly to the elite round for the 2015–16 season, thus setting a new record for Serbian futsal. The club became the highest-ranked Serbian futsal team in the history, and is also the only Serbian futsal club who has qualified directly to the elite round.

Players and Head Coaches

National and International Players
List of notable national and international players who played for Ekonomac.

  Vidan Bojović
  Predrag Brzaković
  Miodrag Aksentijević
  Vladan Vesić
  Predrag Rajić
  Đorđe Jovanović
  Mladen Kocić
  Slobodan Rajčević
  Borko Surudžić
  Miloš Simić
  Slobodan Janjić
  Vladimir Ranisavljević
  Stefan Rakić
  Milan Živić
  Vladimir Lazić
  Jovan Lazarević

  Marko Radovanović
  Marko Novaković
  Aleksa Antonić
  Ivan Stojanović
  Simeun Kopanja
  Kosta Marković 
  Dušan Nikolić
  Dušan Rakić
  Vitaliy Borisov
  Franko Bilić
  Jakov Grcić
  Dmytro Sorokin
  Alen Fetić
  Zoran Leveski
  Daniel Marinho de Souza "Dandan"

Captains
Vidan Bojović has been the captain of Ekonomac for 15 years, from 2000 to 2015, which is also a club record of one player being the caption for such a long period of time. The 2015–16 season started with a new captain, Miloš Simić, who is the youngest captain in the history of Ekonomac.

Head coaches
  Ivan Božović (2001–2013)
  Vladan Cvetanović (2013–March 2016)
  Predrag Rajić (March 2016–July 2019)

Colours
In the original club constitution, Ekonomac's colours were named as orange and white, but during the years the club colours changed but were always based on the orange colour.

Historical kits

Honours

National
Prva Futsal Liga (11): 2008, 2010, 2011, 2012, 2013, 2014, 2015, 2016, 2017, 2018, 2019
Serbian Futsal Cup (5): 2013, 2014, 2017, 2018, 2019

International
 Balkan Cup (1): 2008

Statistics

Season-by-season record

Rank = Rank in the "Prva Futsal Liga Srbije"; P = Played; W = Win; D = Draw; L = Loss; F = Goals for; A = Goals against; GD = Goal difference; Pts = Points; Cup = Serbian Futsal Cup; SF = Semifinals; QF = Quarterfinal; UEFA = UEFA Futsal Cup / UEFA Futsal Champions League; (R) = Relegation.
In the 2005–06 season, Ekonomac played in the SCG Serbian Futsal League (Serbia and Montenegro).
In the 2014–15 season, Ekonomac qualified directly to the UEFA Futsal Cup elite round.
In the 2019–20 season, the national league was finished early due to the COVID-19 pandemic, while the national cup was not completed.

UEFA club coefficient rankings

References

External links
Official website 
UEFA profile

Futsal clubs established in 2000
Futsal clubs in Serbia
Sport in Kragujevac